Lake Erie State Park is a  state park located in the Town of Portland in Chautauqua County, New York, United States, northeast of the village of Brocton. Its major attraction is its Lake Erie beach, in addition to its campsites and other recreational facilities.

Park facilities
The park includes facilities and trails for hiking, cross-country skiing, birdwatching, fishing, boating and camping at one of its 97 campsites or 10 cabins. Swimming is available on scheduled days and times at the beach. An 18-hole disc golf course named "Shipwreck Bluff DGC" was constructed at the park in 2015. The park sells discs and clothing related to the course.

See also
 List of New York state parks

References

External links
 New York State Parks: Lake Erie State Park

State parks of New York (state)
Parks in Chautauqua County, New York
Lake Erie